officially known outside of Japan as EarthBound Beginnings, is a 1989 role-playing video game developed by Ape and Pax Softnica and published by Nintendo for the Famicom. It is the first entry in the Mother series. It is modeled on the gameplay of the Dragon Quest series, but is set in the late 20th-century United States, unlike its fantasy genre contemporaries. Mother follows the young Ninten as he uses his great-grandfather's studies on psychic powers to fight hostile, formerly inanimate objects and other enemies. The game uses random encounters to enter a menu-based, first-person perspective battle system.

Writer and director Shigesato Itoi pitched Mothers concept to Shigeru Miyamoto while visiting Nintendo's headquarters for other business. Though Miyamoto rejected the proposal at first, he eventually gave Itoi a development team. A North American version of the game was localized into English, but was abandoned as commercially nonviable. A copy of this prototype was later found and circulated on the Internet under the informal title EarthBound Zero. The game was eventually released globally as EarthBound Beginnings for the Wii U Virtual Console in June 2015 and Nintendo Switch Online in February 2022.

Mother was the sixth best-selling game of 1989 in Japan, where it sold about 400,000 copies and received a "Silver Hall of Fame" score from Famitsu magazine. Mother was praised for its similarities to the Dragon Quest series and its simultaneous parody of the genre's tropes; however, many considered its sequel Mother 2: Gīgu no Gyakushū (known outside as EarthBound) to be similar and a better overall implementation of Mother gameplay ideas, with the game's high difficulty level polarizing critics, along with balance issues. Jeremy Parish of 1UP.com wrote that Mother importantly generated interest in video game emulation and the historical preservation of unreleased games. The game was re-released in Japan on the single-cartridge compilation Mother 1+2 for the Game Boy Advance in 2003.

Gameplay 

Mother is a single-player, role-playing video game set in a "slightly offbeat", late 20th-century United States as interpreted by Japanese author Shigesato Itoi. The game deliberately avoids traits of its Japanese role-playing game contemporaries: it is not set within the fantasy genre and only enters science fiction for its final sequence. The player fights in warehouses and laboratories instead of in standard dungeons. Instead of swords, assault weapons, and magic, the player uses baseball bats, toy guns, and psychic abilities. The game's protagonist, Ninten, is about 12 years old.

Like the Dragon Quest series, Mother uses a random encounter combat system. The player explores the overworld from a top-down perspective and occasionally enters a first-person perspective battle sequence where the player chooses attack options from a series of menus. On their turn, the player selects between options to fight, guard, check enemy attributes, run away, use items, or use offensive, defensive, or healing psychic powers. The player can also set the battle on autopilot with the "auto" option. Critical hits register with the series' signature "SMAAAASH" text and sound.

The player can press a button to have Ninten "check" or "talk" with nearby people, animals, and objects. The game shares similarities with its sequel, EarthBound: there is a game save option through using a phone to call Ninten's father, an option to store items with Ninten's sister at home, and an automated teller machine for banking money (ATM). The members of Ninten's party are all visible on the overworld screen at once, and are analogous to EarthBound party members in style and function. Mother world map does not keep locations separate, and instead connects all areas (akin to the Pokémon game series). The game's story begins as Ninten discovers a music box and receives the journal of his great-grandfather, who studied psychic powers nearly a century earlier. Ninten is attacked by household items, and ventures outside to find a crazy world with hostile everyday objects and other odd events.

Plot 

Mother begins with the story of a young, married, American couple who mysteriously vanish from their small, rural town. Two years later, the husband, George, returned as mysteriously as he vanished, and began a strange study in complete seclusion. His wife, Maria, was never heard from again. Years later, in 1988 (changed to an ambiguous point in the 1980s in later releases), a young American boy named Ninten is attacked at home in a paranormal event. His father explains that Ninten's great-grandfather studied psychic powers, and asks Ninten to investigate a crisis occurring across the world, later revealed to be the work of an invading alien race. After resolving crises in the town of Mother's Day (Podunk in later translations), Ninten is warped to the world of Magicant, where the land's ruler, Queen Mary, asks Ninten to rediscover a song that appears in her dreams by collecting the parts and playing them for her. Ninten returns to Earth and befriends a young boy, Roido (also called Roid, Loid, or Lloyd in later translations), who is being bullied at an elementary school. The two travel to the town of Snowman to deliver a lost hat to Ana, a young girl with psychic powers. Ana tells Ninten she saw him in a vision, and joins the party in hopes of finding her missing mother.

After finding multiple parts of Queen Mary's song, Ninten is harassed at a karaoke bar by Teddy, the leader of a local gang. Teddy surrenders after battling Ninten in a fistfight, and joins Ninten's party with the intent to avenge the deaths of his parents, who were killed at Holy Loly Mountain (Mt. Itoi in later versions). Roido stays behind. In a cottage at the base of Holy Loly Mountain, Ana pulls Ninten aside and asks him to always be by her side. The two dance and profess their mutual love. Soon after, Teddy warns the party of a strange noise, and a giant robot attacks Ninten and his friends. Roido arrives with a tank and destroys the robot, but accidentally hits the party and critically wounds Teddy, so Lloyd re-joins the party. They take a boat out on Holy Loly Lake and a whirlpool pulls them into an underwater laboratory, where they find a robot who claims to have been built by George to protect Ninten. When the laboratory floods, they leave for the mountain's peak and the robot helps them ascend. Another robot (implied to be an upgraded version of the one fought at the cabin) attacks them at the summit, and George's robot self-destructs to destroy it, leaving behind the seventh part of Queen Mary's song. After learning this melody, the party travels back to Magicant, where Ninten sings the melodies he had learned to Queen Mary. She recalls the rest of the song, thus teaching Ninten the eighth and final melody in the process, and reminisces about an alien named Giygas that she loved as her own child. Queen Mary reveals that she is George's wife, Maria, and vanishes. Magicant, revealed to be a mirage created by her consciousness, vanishes with her. In later translations of the game, Ninten first visits George's grave at the top of Holy Loly Mountain, where George's spirit teaches Ninten the final melody.

The party is warped back to the top of Holy Loly Mountain. Large rocks block the entrance to a cave inside Holy Loly Mountain, but are cleared by the power of Maria's consciousness. In that cave, they find an area with human prisoners including Ana's mother. They need to defeat the Mother Ship to free the prisoners. The party encounters the ship that the fully-grown Giygas is on. The alien expresses its gratefulness to Ninten's family for raising it, but explains that George stole vital information from its people that could have been used to betray them, and proceeds to accuse Ninten of interfering with their plans. Giygas offers to save Ninten alone if he boards the Mother Ship, only for Ninten to decline, leading Giygas to attack Ninten's party. The party begins to sing Queen Mary's lullaby while Giygas tries to quiet the party through his attacks. However, the party persists and finishes the lullaby, causing Giygas to become overwhelmed with emotion at the thought of Maria's motherly love. Giygas swears that they will meet again and flies off in the mother ship.

In the original Famicom release, the game then ends with Ninten, Ana, and Lloyd facing the player as the credits roll behind them. Later releases feature an extended ending with the kids returning home and reuniting with their families. Teddy recovers from his injuries and becomes a singer, Lloyd is now treated like a hero among his classmates and Ana is shown receiving a letter from Ninten. Ninten goes to bed as the cast of characters appear at the bottom of the screen before the credits. After the credits, the game freezes on an image of a man, presumably Ninten's father, trying to call his son, stating, "I know that boy is home. Come on son and answer the phone.

Development 

Mother was developed by Ape and Pax Softnica and published by Nintendo. While visiting Nintendo for other work, copywriter Shigesato Itoi pitched his idea for a role-playing game set in contemporary times to the company's Shigeru Miyamoto. He thought the setting would be unique for its incongruence with role-playing genre norms, as daily life lacked the pretense for magic powers and they could not simply give the child characters firearms as weapons. Itoi's project proposal suggested how the natural limitations could be circumvented. Miyamoto met with him and praised the idea, though he was not sure whether Itoi "could pull it off". As an advertiser, Itoi was used to concept proposals preceding the staffing process, but Miyamoto explained that video game concepts needed people who signed on to "make" the product. Itoi was overcome with "powerlessness".

Miyamoto was also hesitant to work with Itoi at a time when companies were pushing major celebrity product endorsements, as Itoi's involvement would be for such a game. When the two met next, Miyamoto brought the documentation from a text adventure game and told Itoi that he would have to write similar documentation himself. Miyamoto said that he knew from his own experience that the game would only be as good as the effort Itoi invested, and that he knew Itoi could not invest the appropriate time with his full-time job. Itoi restated his interest and reduced his workload, so Miyamoto assembled a development team. Upon assessing for compatibility, they began production in Ichikawa, Chiba. Itoi had said earlier that he wanted his work environment to feel like an extracurricular club consisting of volunteers and working out of an apartment, which Miyamoto tried to accommodate. Itoi wrote the game's script and commuted from Tokyo, a process he found "exhausting". Even with asking Itoi to prioritize the development process, Miyamoto received criticism of acquiescing to celebrity and of hiring a copywriter not up for the task. Miyamoto said that his decision to pursue the project was based on his confidence in Itoi. According to Itoi in a 1989 Famitsu interview, the word "mothership" was the influence for the game's title, although he states the title had other meanings too. Mother was released in Japan on July 27, 1989, for the Famicom (known as the Nintendo Entertainment System outside Japan).

Localization and release 
The game was scheduled for a U.S. release as Earth Bound in late 1991, but the project was cancelled. According to Phil Sandhop, the director of Mother localization, in an interview with LostLevels.org, "the Mother project and localizing it really opened up a few eyes at Nintendo. They began working closer with Nintendo of America and the other subsidiaries to produce artwork for games that would be appropriately received anywhere in the world and not need localization". In later years, a completely localized ROM file was found, and was distributed online under the fan-coined title EarthBound Zero.

In June 2015, Mother was officially released via the Wii U's Virtual Console service, and released worldwide for the first time under the official title EarthBound Beginnings. In addition, the protagonist from the third entry, Lucas from Mother 3, was released as downloadable content for Super Smash Bros. for Nintendo 3DS and Wii U.

In February 2022, Nintendo released the game as EarthBound Beginnings for  Nintendo Switch Online alongside its sequel EarthBound.

Music 

The game's soundtrack was composed by Keiichi Suzuki and Hirokazu Tanaka. Tanaka was a video game composer working for Nintendo who had previously composed for games such as Super Mario Land and Metroid, while Suzuki was a composer and musician for bands of many different genres. The NES was only able to play three notes at a time, which Suzuki has noted greatly limited what he was able to produce, as he could not create some of the sounds he wanted.

An eleven-track album of songs inspired by the game's soundtrack was recorded in Tokyo, London, and Bath and released by CBS/Sony Records on August 21, 1989. The album contained mostly vocal arrangements in English and was likened by RPGFan reviewer Patrick Gann to compositions by the Beatles and for children's television shows. He found the lyrics "cheesy and trite" but appreciated the "simple statements" in "Eight Melodies" and the "quirky and wonderful" "Magicant". Only the last song on the album is in chiptune. Gann ultimately recommended the 2004 remastered release over this version. The game's soundtrack contains several tracks later used in subsequent series games.

Reception and legacy 
Mother was the sixth best-selling game of 1989 in Japan, where it sold about 400,000 copies. Mother received a "Silver Hall of Fame" score of 31/40 from Japanese magazine Famitsu. Reviewers noted the game's similarities with the Dragon Quest series and its simultaneous "parody" of the genre's tropes. They thought the game's sequel, EarthBound, to be very similar and a better implementation of Mother gameplay ideas. Critics also disliked the game's high difficulty level and balance issues.

Jeremy Parish of USgamer described the game as a mild-mannered parody ("between satire and pastiche") of the role-playing game genre, specifically the Dragon Quest series. He noted that Mother, like many Japanese role-playing games, emulated the Dragon Quest style: the windowed interface, first-person perspective in combat, and graphics, but differed in its contemporary setting and non-fantasy story. Parish commented that Atlus's 1987 Digital Devil Story: Megami Tensei was similarly set in the modern day, though it devolved into science fiction and fantasy in ways Mother did not. He added that the game has "a sense of wonder and magic realism ... in the context of childhood imagination", as Ninten can feel more like someone "pretending" to be a Dragon Quest-style hero than a hero in his own right. Parish said this makes the player wonder which game events are real and which are Ninten's imagination. Parish cited Itoi's interest in entering the games industry to make a "satirical" role-playing game as proof of the genre's swift five-year rise to widespread popularity in Japan.

Cassandra Ramos of RPGamer praised the game's graphics and music, and considered it among the console's best, with "rich, ... nicely detailed" visuals, Peanuts-style characters, and "simple but effective" audio. In contrast, she found the battle sequences aesthetically "pretty bland" and, otherwise, the game's "least interesting" aspect. Overall, she found Mother "surprisingly complex ... for its time", and considered its story superior to (but less "wacky" than) its sequel. She especially recommended the game for EarthBound fans.

Parish credited Itoi for the game's vision and compared his ability and literary interests with American author Garrison Keillor. Parish felt that Itoi's pedigree as a writer and copywriter was well suited for the space-limited, 8-bit role-playing game medium, which privileged Mother ahead of other games written by non-writers. USgamer Parish noted how the game's non-player characters would "contemplate the profound and trivial" instead of reciting the active plot. He added that the game's lack of an official North American release has bolstered the reputation and revere of its immediate sequel.

While Parish said Mother script was "as sharp as EarthBound", he felt that the original's game mechanics did not meet the same level of quality. Mother lacked the "rolling HP counter" and non-random encounters for which later entries in the series were known. Parish also found the game's balance to be uneven, as the statistical character attributes and level of difficulty scaled incorrectly with the game's progression. Rose Colored Gaming, a company that made custom reproductions of the NES cartridge, noted that the Japanese release's was more challenging than the unreleased English localization. RPGamer Ramos similarly found balance issues, with a high number of battles, difficult enemies, reliance on grinding, and some oversized levels. Parish wrote earlier for 1UP.com that in comparison to EarthBound, Mother is "worse in just about every way", a clone where its sequel was "a satirical deconstruction of RPGs". He wrote that the game's historical significance is not for its actual game but for the interest it generated in video game emulation and the preservation of unreleased games.

Mother was rereleased in Japan as the single-cartridge Mother 1+2 for the Game Boy Advance in 2003. This version uses the extended ending of the unreleased English prototype, but is only presented in Japanese. Starmen.net hosted a Mother 25th Anniversary Fanfest in 2014 with a livestream of the game and plans for a remixed soundtrack. Later that year, fans released a 25th Anniversary Edition ROM hack that updated the game's graphics, script, and gameplay balance.

A film group known as 54&O Productions developed a fan-made documentary entitled Mother to Earth. The documentary focused on the road to Mother's localization in North America, and includes interviews with key people behind the process. It was released on Vimeo in August 2020.

Notes and references

Notes

References

External links 
  

1989 video games
Game Boy Advance games
Mother (video game series)
Nintendo Entertainment System games
Nintendo Switch Online games
Pax Softnica games
Role-playing games introduced in 1989
Role-playing video games
Video games about psychic powers
Video games developed in Japan
Video games produced by Shigeru Miyamoto
Video games scored by Hirokazu Tanaka
Video games scored by Keiichi Suzuki
Video games set in North America
Video games set in the 1980s
Virtual Console games
Virtual Console games for Wii U